76 mm air defense gun M1938 was a 76.2 mm (3 inch) Soviet air defense gun, created by Soviet artillery designer  M.N.Loginov. This gun was a modernized version of  the 76 mm air defense gun M1931, with a slightly modernized barrel and a completely new two-axle carriage ZU-8. This carriage was also used for the more powerful 85 mm 52-K air defense gun, developed in 1939.

The 85 mm gun was chosen for mass production by the Soviet authorities and tooling was switched from the 76.2 mm AD guns, to the 85 mm gun. As a result of this decision, the total number of M1938 AD guns, delivered to the Red Army, was relatively small. These guns were used in the first stages of the German-Soviet War and were gradually replaced by the more powerful 52-Ks.

Guns captured by the Germans were given the designation 7.62 cm Flak M.38(r) and were used unmodified until their ammunition supply ran out.  When their ammunition supply ran out they were rebored to fire German 8.8 cm ammunition and their designation was changed to 7.62/8.8 cm Flak M.38(r) and remained in use until the end of the war.

The external appearance of the 76 mm and 85 mm AD guns is very close; the two types can be differentiated by their muzzle brake, the larger gun possessing the larger muzzle brake.

References

 

Anti-aircraft guns of the Soviet Union
World War II artillery of the Soviet Union
76 mm artillery
Military equipment introduced in the 1930s